Lettie Viljoen was a pseudonym of the South African author Ingrid Winterbach, who primarily writes in Afrikaans. She lives in Jamestown, Stellenbosch.

Life and education
Winterbach was born in Johannesburg in 1948. She got her early education from Florida High School, Johannesburg and studied Afrikaans, Dutch and Fine Arts at the University of the Witwatersrand, and went on to a postgraduate degree in Afrikaans and Dutch at the University of Stellenbosch under D.J. Opperman. She went on to work as a teacher, a journalist, a Fine Arts lecturer at the University of Stellenbosch and a lecturer in Afrikaans and Dutch at the University of Natal. She has been a full-time writer and painter since 2002. Most of her mature novels have been translated into Dutch and English (chiefly by Michiel Heyns).

List of titles

As Lettie Viljoen
1984 Klaaglied vir Koos
1986 Erf
1990 Belemmering
1993 Karolina Ferreira (published in English as The Elusive Moth, 2005)
1996 Landskap met vroue en slang

As Ingrid Winterbach
1999 Buller se Plan
2002 Niggie (published in English as To Hell with Cronje, 2007)
2006 Die Boek van Toeval en Toeverlaat (published in English as The Book of Happenstance, 2008)
2010 Die Benederyk (published in English as The Road of Excess, 2014)
2012 Die Aanspraak van Lewende Wesens (published in English as It Might Get Loud, 2015)
2015 Vlakwater (published in English as The Shallows, 2017)
2018 Die Troebel Tyd (published in English as The Troubled Times of Magrieta Prinsloo, 2019)
2021 Voorouer. Pelgrim. Berg.

Awards
 1994 M-Net Literary Awards – Karolina Ferreira
 1994 Old Mutual Literary Award – Karolina Ferreira
 2000 WA Hofmeyr Prize – Buller se plan
 2004 Hertzog Prize for Prose – Niggie 
 2007 WA Hofmeyr Prize – Die boek van toeval en toeverlaat
 2007 M-Net Literary Awards – Die boek van toeval en toeverlaat
 2007 University of Johannesburg Prize for Creative Writing – Die boek van toeval en toeverlaat
 2010 South African Literary Award for literary translation for the translation of Die boek van toeval en toeverlaat
 2012 C.L. Engelbrecht Prize for Literature – Die boek van toeval en toeverlaat
 2012 NB-Uitgewers Groot Romankompetisie – Die aanspraak van lewende wesens (Human & Rousseau)
 2013 M-Net Literary Awards - Die aanspraak van lewende wesens
 2013 Hertzog Prize for Prose – Die aanspraak van lewende wesens
 2013 WA Hofmeyr Prize (Media24 Books Literary Awards) – Die aanspraak van lewende wesens

References

External links
 Author's website
 Human & Rousseau (publishers)
 Stellenbosch writers: Lettie Viljoen - Ingrid Winterbach

1948 births
Living people
Hertzog Prize winners for prose
20th-century South African novelists
21st-century South African novelists
South African women novelists
Pseudonymous women writers
20th-century pseudonymous writers